Sonus is a Latin word that means “noise, sound” or “tone, character, style.” It is also the root word for sonic and sound and was included in the names of well-known companies, including Sonus Networks, PlaySonus, Sony and Panasonic, among others.

The name may also refer to:

Sonus Networks, was a technology and telecommunications company headquartered in Massachusetts, merged into Ribbon Communications
SONUS, the online jukebox of electroacoustic works maintained by the Canadian Electroacoustic Community
Sonus, a popular line of electric bass guitars produced by Zon Guitars
Sonar, an underwater device which emits a ping and is used in submarine warfare.
Sonus (journal)

Musical ensembles 
 Sonus choir in Nashville, Tennessee 
 Sonus-kuoro, choir in Kouvola, Finland
 Sonus, orchestra in Stockholm, Sweden

See also
Sonos (disambiguation)

Latin words and phrases

la:Sonus